The ZALA 421-06 is an unmanned aerial vehicle helicopter designed and produced by Izhevsk-based ZALA Aero. This helicopter was developed in 2007–2008. In June, 2008 ZALA 421-06 was transferred to Russian Ministry of the Interior. This UAV can fly by program (in fully autonomous mode) and in manual mode.

Specifications 

Physical:
 Range: 40 km max
 Flight duration: 0.5 h
 Power unit: internal combustion engine 
 Cruising speed – 54 km/h
 Maximum speed – 89 km/h
 Maximum flight altitude - 4000 m above sea level
 Size: 0,4 m ×1,57 m ×0,67 m
 Main rotor diameter  - 1,77 m
 Payload weight - 3.5 kg max
 Takeoff/landing: vertical

Payload:
 Color Video camera  550 TVL
 Infrared camera 320*240 pixels
 Photo camera 10 megapixels

External links 
 Official site.

2000s Russian special-purpose aircraft
Unmanned helicopters
Unmanned aerial vehicles of Russia
421-06
2000s Russian helicopters